Korean Police Baseball Team was a South Korean amateur baseball team that existed from 2005 to 2019, and competed in the KBO Futures League from 2006 through 2019. Their home stadium was Byeokje Baseball Stadium in Goyang. The team was controlled by the Seoul Metropolitan Police Agency, which itself is a division of the National Police Agency.

The Police were not affiliated with any single KBO League team, instead fielding a roster made of players from many of the KBO franchises. Over the Police team's history, however, it had a preponderance of players from the Doosan Bears franchise. Notable KBO League players who at one time served on the Police team included Choi Hyoung-woo, Yang Eui-ji, Min Byung-hun, Jung Soo-bin, Rhee Dae-eun, Son Seung-lak, and Won Jong-hyun.

Structure 
Many professional players who were serving compulsory military service played for the Police team, usually for a term of two seasons. Players were considered part of the auxiliary police, and completed their national duty as police officers after they finished recruit training.

The Korea Baseball Organization provided the Police team about 1.5 billion won ($1.3 million) in operating expenses each year.

History 
The Police team was the champion of the Northern League division of the Futures League in 2012, 2013, 2014, 2016, 2017, and 2018.

In 2017 the South Korean government announced it was abolishing the auxiliary police by the year 2023; the National Police Agency immediately stopped recruiting athletes and promised to disband its sports teams (including the Police team) by the following year. The Police team was disbanded after the 2019 Futures League season; the team played its final game on July 10, 2019, against the Hanwha Eagles Futures League team.

Altogether, more than 200 players fulfilled their military duties on the Police team during its existence.

Notable former players

See also
 Korean Police FC
 Sangmu Phoenix
 Seoul Metropolitan Police Agency

References 
Notes

 General

External links
 Official Cafe

Police Baseball
Baseball teams established in 2005
Police Baseball
Police sports clubs
2005 establishments in South Korea